Axel Monjé (1910 – 1962) was a German stage and film actor.

Selected filmography
 Central Rio (1939)
 Counterfeiters (1940)
 My Life for Ireland (1941)
 Hoegler's Mission (1950)
 Come Back (1953)
 The Mosquito (1954)
 The Little Czar (1954)
 Emil and the Detectives (1954)
 The Seven Dresses of Katrin (1954)
 Captain Wronski (1954)
 Peter Shoots Down the Bird (1959)
 Freddy, the Guitar and the Sea (1959)

References

Bibliography
 Rolf Giesen. Nazi Propaganda Films: A History and Filmography. McFarland, 2003.

External links

1910 births
1962 deaths
German male film actors
German male stage actors
People from Bremerhaven